Janet Holmes à Court, AC, HonFAHA, HonFAIB (born Janet Lee Ranford on 29 November 1943 in Perth, Western Australia) is an Australian businesswoman and one of Australia's wealthiest women.  She is the Chairperson of one of Australia's largest private companies, Heytesbury Pty Ltd, having turned around its fortunes after the death of her husband Robert Holmes à Court in 1990. She retained full ownership of the Heytesbury Group of companies until 2008 when her son, Peter Holmes à Court, assumed ownership, while she remained chairman.

Education and career
Holmes à Court attended Perth Modern School and the University of Western Australia, where she graduated with a Bachelor of Science degree majoring in organic chemistry and a Diploma of Education in 1965. After graduation, she worked as a science teacher before marrying her husband in 1966 and having four children with him.

She currently lives in Perth. As her children left home, she developed interests in medical research, the arts and various charitable organisations.

After the death of her husband, she took over management of Heytesbury Pty Ltd, which was considerably in debt, rescuing and expanding it.  The company operates cattle stations in remote Western Australia and has interests in vineyards, wine-making and engineering contracting.

She owns the Holmes à Court Gallery located in the original Vasse Felix winery at Cowaramup, near Margaret River, in Western Australia which displays works from the Holmes à Court Collection.

As well as her business activities, Holmes à Court has been an active participant in progressive social issues, such as an advocate for the Australian Republican Movement at the 1998 constitutional convention, and is the chairperson of the Australian Children's Television Foundation, the West Australian Symphony Orchestra and deputy chairman of the Chamber of Arts and Culture WA.  She has also served on the board of the Reserve Bank of Australia and is an Honorary Fellow of the Australian Institute of Building. She was Pro-Chancellor of the University of Western Australia from 1990 to 1994, and a Senate member of both Murdoch University and the University of Western Australia.

Honours and awards
She was appointed Officer of the Order of Australia (AO) in 1995 and promoted to a Companion of the Order (AC) on Australia Day 2007 for service to business, particularly as a leader in the construction, wine and cattle industries, to the advancement of Western Australia's musical and theatre culture, to the visual arts, and to the community. In 2001, she was awarded the Centenary Medal for her service to the arts as Chair of the West Australian Symphony Orchestra and Black Swan Theatre Company. The National Trust of Australia has included her on its list of 100 Australian Living Treasures.

Her other honours and awards include: 
 United Kingdom Veuve Clicquot Business Woman of the Year, 1995
 Institute of Engineers Medal, The Institute of Engineers Australia, 1997
 Inducted into the Leading Business Entrepreneurs of the World (USA), 1997
 International Business Council of Western Australia Business Award, 1998
 AbaF Richard Pratt Business Leadership Award, 2003 
 Lifetime Commitment Award, WA State Arts Sponsorship Scheme Awards, 2003 
 Champion Award for the Year of the Built Environment (Western Australia), State Steering Committee, 2004 
 WA Gold Medal Award, Australian Institute of Company Directors, 2007
 Companion of Engineers Australia, The Institute of Engineers Australia, 2007
 United Way Philanthropist of the Year Award, 2008
 The Woodrow Wilson Corporate Citizenship Award, 2009
 Inducted into the International Women's Day WA Women's Hall of Fame, 2011 
 Elected Honorary Fellow of the Australian Academy of the Humanities, 2011 
 Australian Achievement in Architecture National President's Prize, 2011 
 Champion of Entrepreneurship Award, Ernst & Young Entrepreneur of the Year Awards, 2012 
 John Shaw Medal, 2014

She holds a number of honorary doctorates including:
 Doctor of the University, Central Queensland University, 1994 
 Doctor of the University, Murdoch University, 1997
 Doctor of Letters, University of Western Australia, 1997
 Doctor of Business, University of Ballarat, 2007
 Doctor of Business, Charles Sturt University, 2008 
 Doctor of Arts, Edith Cowan University, 2011

References

Notes
Edgar, Patricia (1999). Janet Holmes à Court. Australia. Harper Collins. The official biography

External links

1943 births
Living people
University of Western Australia alumni
Australian art collectors
Australian republicans
Companions of the Order of Australia
Delegates to the Australian Constitutional Convention 1998
Holmes à Court family
People educated at Perth Modern School
People from Perth, Western Australia
Australian women in business